Condica vecors, the dusky groundling, is a moth of the family Noctuidae. The species was first described by Achille Guenée in 1852. It is found from Newfoundland to Florida, west to Arizona and north to Ontario.

The wingspan is 29–38 mm. Adults have mottled dark brown and black forewings. The hindwings are greyish brown with a conspicuous whitish fringe. They are on wing from May to August in the north and from April to October in the south. There are two generations per year.

The larvae feed on Eupatorium and lettuce.

References

Condicinae
Moths of North America
Moths described in 1852